= La Kabylie française =

French Newspaper

- Type: Weekly
- Founded: 1885
- Political alignment: Radical socialist
- Language: French language
- Headquarters: Tizi-Ouzou

La Kabylie française was a French language radical socialist weekly newspaper published from Tizi-Ouzou, Algeria. The newspaper was founded in 1885.
